Morsano al Tagliamento (Standard Friulian: ;

Geography
Morsano borders the following municipalities: Camino al Tagliamento, Cordovado, Fossalta di Portogruaro, San Michele al Tagliamento, San Vito al Tagliamento, Sesto al Reghena, Teglio Veneto, Varmo.

References

External links

Official website

Cities and towns in Friuli-Venezia Giulia